Darkmind is the third full-length album by Beto Vázquez Infinity.

Track listing
 "From Your Heart" - 3:12
 "Kingdom Of Liberty" - 4:34
 "Magical Moments Of Time" - 4:44
 "Mystic" - 3:28
 "Darkmind" - 4:36
 "For Time Runs In My Veins" - 3:40
 "Sleeping In The Shadows" - 6:16
 "Chronicles Of A World Without Gods" - 3:40
 "Close Your Eyes" - 4:30
 "Follow The Moonlight" - 3:43
 "Memories Of Reinglow" - 4:39
 "The Tunnel Of The Souls" (bonus track) - 4:21

Credits
Jessica Lehto - vocals 
Victor Rivarola - vocals
Karina Varela - vocals
Carlos Ferrari - Lead and rhythm guitars
Lucas Pereyra - Programming 
Beto Vázquez - Bass, acoustic and rhythm guitars, programming
Norberto Roman - drums

Guest musicians
Sandra Schleret - Elis - Track 7 
Sonya Scarlet - Theatres des Vampires
Marcela Bovio - Stream of Passion - Track 12
Eddy Antonini - Skylark 
Kiara - Skylark - Track 8
Olaf Thörsen - Vision Divine 
Pablo Soler - Pablo Soler 
Manda Ophuis - Nemesea - Track 4
H.J De Jong - Nemesea 
Ivana Anic Lara - Angelseed 
Rute Fevereiro - Black Widows - Enchantya 
Sabrina Carrion - Heavenfalls - Track 2
Elisa Luna - Gasthof Rose - Track 6
Jessica Lehto - Once There Was - Track 10

Beto Vázquez Infinity albums
2008 albums